Damon Laurance Diletti (born 1 May 1971 in Perth, Western Australia) is a former field hockey goalkeeper from Australia, who competed in three consequentive Summer Olympics for his native country, starting in 1992. At each appearance the electrician won a medal.

Diletti was nicknamed Dingo by his teammates, and was a member of The Kookaburras team for nine years. Apart from three Olympics he participated in two Hockey World Cups and six Champions Trophy tournaments. He resigned after the 2000 Summer Olympics, after playing 133 international matches for Australia. He is the current U14 Boys division 1 coach at the Modernians hockey club.

External links
 
 Profile on Hockey Australia
 

1971 births
Australian male field hockey players
Male field hockey goalkeepers
Olympic field hockey players of Australia
Olympic silver medalists for Australia
Olympic bronze medalists for Australia
Field hockey players at the 1992 Summer Olympics
Field hockey players at the 1996 Summer Olympics
Field hockey players at the 2000 Summer Olympics
1998 Men's Hockey World Cup players
Field hockey players from Perth, Western Australia
Living people
Olympic medalists in field hockey
Medalists at the 2000 Summer Olympics
Medalists at the 1996 Summer Olympics
Medalists at the 1992 Summer Olympics
Commonwealth Games medallists in field hockey
Commonwealth Games gold medallists for Australia
Field hockey players at the 1998 Commonwealth Games
20th-century Australian people
Medallists at the 1998 Commonwealth Games